Yanagihara (written: 柳原) is a Japanese surname. Notable people with the surname include:

Hanya Yanagihara (born 1974), American writer
, Japanese singer and idol
, Japanese actress, comedian and television personality
, Japanese lady-in-waiting of the Imperial House of Japan

See also
Yanagihara Station (disambiguation), multiple railway stations in Japan

Japanese-language surnames